John Franklin Douglas (September 14, 1917 – February 11, 1984) was an American first baseman in major league baseball who played five games during the 1945 season for the Brooklyn Dodgers. Born in Thayer, West Virginia, he died at age 66 in Miami, Florida.

External links

1917 births
1984 deaths
Major League Baseball first basemen
Brooklyn Dodgers players
Baseball players from West Virginia
People from Fayette County, West Virginia
Miami RedHawks baseball players
Miami Wahoos players
Mobile Bears players
St. Paul Saints (AA) players
Louisville Colonels (minor league) players
San Francisco Seals (baseball) players
Albany Senators players
Syracuse Chiefs players